A hobby is an activity done regularly for pleasure.

Hobby may also refer to:

Hobby (surname)
Hobby (bird), a small, very swift falcon 
Irish Hobby, a type of horse ridden by Hobelars in the Middle Ages
Hobby Airport, a public airport serving the Houston, Texas, area in the United States
Hobbyist, slang for a sex client soliciting online

Ships
USS Hobby (DD-610), a United States Navy destroyer in commission from 1942 to 1946
USS William M. Hobby (DE-286), a United States Navy destroyer escort converted during construction into the high-speed transport USS William M. Hobby (APD-95)
USS William M. Hobby (APD-95), a United States high-speed transport in commission from 1945 to 1946

See also

 
 
 
 Hobby horse
 Hobby horse (toy)
 Hobbe (disambiguation)
 Hobbie (disambiguation)